Zions Bancorporation is a bank holding company headquartered in Salt Lake City, Utah. Zions Bancorporation originated as Keystone Insurance and Investment Co. in April 1955. In April 1960, Keystone, together with several individual investors, acquired a 57.5 percent interest in Zions First National Bank from The Church of Jesus Christ of Latter-day Saints. In 1965, the name of the company was changed to Zions Bancorporation. (However, it operated as Zions Utah Bancorporation from 1966 to 1987.) 

The first public offering of shares in Zions Bancorporation was made in January 1966. There continued to be some minority shareholders until April 1972, when the company exchanged the remaining minority shares for common shares. In 2018, Zions Bancorporation merged into its bank subsidiary, ZB, N.A., which was then renamed Zions Bancorporation, N.A. Zions Bancorporation now operates as a national bank doing business under eight local brands, rather than as a holding company.

History
The final and fourth attempted national bank created in Utah, Deseret National Bank, incorporated in 1868. Zion's Bank became an offshoot when it incorporated in July 1873. "Zion's Savings Bank & Trust Company was established by the Mormon Church to take over the savings department of the Deseret National Bank." Brigham Young was the first president, and the bank was intended to encourage thrift, help promote immigration to Utah, and mobilize savings for the LDS Church when investments were of interest.
 
During the Panic of 1893, the bank managed not only to remain solvent, but continued to grow.

During the early 20th century, Zions financed such firms as:

 Bingham Copper Company (later Kennecott Utah Copper)
 Salt Lake and Los Angeles Railroad Company (now Union Pacific Railroad)
 Big Cottonwood Power Company (later Utah Power and today Rocky Mountain Power)
 Salt Lake Gas Company (later Mountain Fuel Supply Company and today Questar Gas)

The Panic of 1907 was the lone interruption in the steady growth of Zions. However, deposits grew from $2 million in 1901 to $9 million in 1918.

Great Depression
On the morning of February 15, 1932, 3 years after the Wall Street Crash of 1929, customers began a run on the bank, waiting in lines that ran out of the building and onto the street. Tellers were instructed to honor all withdrawal requests. In 2.5 days, a total of $1.5 million was withdrawn. Near the end of the second day, bank (and The Church of Jesus Christ of Latter-day Saints) president Heber J. Grant placed a sign in the bank's window that read, in part:

[The bank] is in a very strong, clean, liquid condition. It can pay off every depositor in full. Fear of its failure is not only without foundation, but positively foolish. There is not a safer bank in the State or the Nation.

Lines of customers that had been as long as a city block began to dwindle, and within five or six days many customers returned to deposit their money. By month's end, total deposits were more than withdrawals, and Zions had survived the Great Depression.

In 1957, Zion's merged with Utah Savings and Trust Company and First National Bank of Salt Lake City. The surviving institution was named Zions First National Bank.

1960–2007
In 1960, Keystone Insurance and Investment Company, which had been founded in 1955, bought a majority stake in Zions from the Church of Jesus Christ of Latter-day Saints and changed its name to Zions Utah Bancorporation. It kept that name until 1987, when it was shortened to Zions Bancorporation, its present name, to reflect the growing presence of the company outside of Utah.

In January 1966, Zions became a public company via an initial public offering.

The bank expanded into Nevada in 1985 with the purchase of Nevada State Bank.

The bank entered Arizona in 1986 with the acquisition of Mesa Bank.

It expanded into Colorado and New Mexico in 1996 by acquiring Aspen Bancshares, which operated Pitkin County Bank and Trust, Valley National Bank of Cortez, and Centennial Savings Bank.

Zions made many acquisitions in 1997 and 1998.

In 1997, Zions acquired Vectra Banking Corporation and Tri-State Finance Corporation of Colorado. Zions also acquired Tri-State Bank of Idaho. It also bought 27 branches in Arizona, Idaho, Nevada, and Utah from Wells Fargo.

In 1999, the company bid for First Security Corporation but lost to Wells Fargo after the U.S. Securities and Exchange Commission forced Zions to restate its results in prior years due to the way it accounted for acquisitions. Despite the unsuccessful pursuit of First Security, Zions became the largest bank headquartered in Utah.

In 2001, the company was added to the S&P 500 Index.

In 2005, the company expanded into Texas with the purchase of Amegy Bank.

2008–present
On October 27, 2008, Zions received a $1.4 billion investment from the U.S. government as a result of the Troubled Asset Relief Program. It repaid the final $700 million on September 26, 2012, and the government realized a profit of $253 million from its investment in the company.

On August 31, 2010, Zions announced the sale of its NetDeposit subsidiary to BankServ.

On June 1, 2015, Zions Bancorporation announced a corporate restructuring, which included the consolidation of seven bank charters into a single charter and $120 million in expense reduction initiatives.

In November 2017, Zions announced plans to merge the holding company and its banking subsidiary ZB, N.A. into one Zions Bancorporation, N.A.

Leadership

Board
Gail Miller of the Larry H. Miller Company serves on the board of Zions Bank.

References

External links

 Zions Bancorporation SEC EDGAR Filings History

1873 establishments in Utah Territory
Banks based in Utah
Companies based in Salt Lake City
Banks established in 1873
Companies listed on the Nasdaq
History of the Latter Day Saint movement